Ganisa cyanogrisea is a moth in the family Eupterotidae. It was described by Rudolf Mell in 1929. It is found in China. The Global Lepidoptera Names Index considers this to be a synonym of Ganisa similis.

References

Moths described in 1929
Eupterotinae